The Professionals is a 1960 British crime thriller, directed by Don Sharp.

It screened on US television the following year as part of the Kraft Mystery Theatre series. It was one of a series of films Anglo-Amalgamated sold to US television for one million dollars.

Premise
A gang of criminals, Joe Lawson, Vince Clayton and Eddie Holden, rob a suburban bank. Lawson then wants to rob a city bank and enlists the services of safe cracker Philip Bowman, who is just out of prison and is about to marry his girlfriend, Ruth. The thieves manage to rob the bank but Inspector Rankin interrogates Holden about the earlier robbery. Holden confesses and the police arrest the gang just as Bowman marries Ruth.

Cast
 William Lucas as Philip Bowman
 Andrew Faulds as Inspector Rankin
 Colette Wilde as Ruth
 Stratford Johns as Lawson
 Vilma Ann Leslie as Mabel
 Edward Cast as Clayton
 Charles Vance as Eddie Holden
 Jack May as Edwards
 Eric Corrie as Detective
 Arthur Skinner as Plainclothes Man
 Douglas Muir as Beaumont
 David Williams as Constable
 Arthur Hewlett as Hoskins
 Patrick Boxill as Renagan
 Stuart Hillier as Condor
 Raymond Ray as Night Watchman
 Noel Coleman as Chief Inspector

Production
The film was based on an original script by Peter Barnes. In September 1959 it was announced that the director would be Sidney Hayers. The job of directing eventually went to Don Sharp, who had been going to make another film written by Barnes, Echo of Barbara, that does not seem to have been made.

It was the first fictional film Sharp made for Independent Artists, although he had made the documentary Keeping the Peace for the same producers. Independent Artists were based at Beaconsfield but the studio was so busy at the time that The Professionals had to be filmed at Pinewood.

Reception
The Kinematograph Weekly called it an "engrossing and thrilling tale."

The New York Times TV critic called the show "an item of first rate suspense".

The film was so well received that Independent Artists then offered Sharp the job of directing Linda. The film also led to Sharp being offered Kiss of the Vampire.

References

External links
 

1960 films
British crime thriller films
Films directed by Don Sharp
Films scored by William Alwyn
1960s English-language films
1960s British films